Potegaon is a village in the Karmala taluka of Solapur district in Maharashtra state, India.

Demographics
Covering  and comprising 163 households at the time of the 2011 census of India, Potegaon had a population of 687. There were 370 males and 317 females, with 67 people being aged six or younger.

References

Villages in Karmala taluka